The 1959–60 Boston Bruins season saw the Bruins finish in fifth place in the National Hockey League (NHL) with a record of 28 wins, 34 losses, and 8 ties for 64 points.

Regular season

Final standings

Record vs. opponents

Schedule and results

Playoffs

Boston's fifth-place finish caused them to miss the Stanley Cup playoffs for the first time since the 1955–56 season.

Player statistics

Regular season
Scoring

Goaltending

Awards and records

Bronco Horvath, Centre, NHL Second All-Star Team
Don McKenney, Lady Byng Memorial Trophy

Transactions
Claim Aut Erikson from Chicago, Charlie Burns from Detroit and Bruce Gamble from New York.

Farm teams

References

Boston Bruins seasons
Boston Bruins
Boston Bruins
Boston Bruins
Boston Bruins
1950s in Boston
1960s in Boston